NGC 189 is an open cluster in the Cassiopeia constellation. It was discovered by Caroline Herschel on 27 September 1783, and independently rediscovered by John Herschel on 27 October 1829.

References

External links
 NGC 189 @ SEDS NGC objects pages
 NGC 189 at NightSkyInfo.com
 

Open clusters
Cassiopeia (constellation)
0189
Astronomical objects discovered in 1783